Trebula (also spelled Trebula Mutusca or simply Mutusca or Mutuscae) was an ancient city of the Sabines in what is now central Italy, one of two bearing the name Trebula – Pliny being the only author who mentions both places: Trebulani qui cognominantur Mutuscaei, et qui Suffenates. Its site is clearly fixed at Monteleone Sabino, a village about 3 km on the right of the Via Salaria, between Osteria Nuova and Poggio San Lorenzo. There are considerable ruins here including those of a theatre, of thermae or baths, and portions of the ancient pavement. Several inscriptions have also been found here, some of which bear the name of its people, Plebs Trebulana, Trebulani Mutuscani, and Trebulani Mut., so that no doubt can remain of their attribution.

As this seems to have been much the more considerable place of the two Sabine cities named Trebula (the other being Trebula Suffenas), it is probably that meant by Strabo, who mentions Trebula without any distinctive adjunct but in conjunction with Eretum. The Liber Coloniarumn also mentions a "Tribule", municipium<ref>Liber Coloniarum, p. 258</ref> which is probably the same place. Martial also alludes to Trebula as situated among cold and damp mountain valleys, but it is not certain which of the two places he here refers to.

Temple of Feronia
There was once a temple of Feronia, which was plundered by Hannibal. Virgil speaks of Mutusca as abounding in olives (oliviferaeque Mutuscae''), which is still the case with the neighbourhood of Monteleone Sabino, and a village near it consequently bears the name of Oliveto. Excavation work from 2000 until now have uncovered the porch of the temple of Feronia which once featured peripheral walls of breccia, originally made from wood, that was replaced later by another wall composed travertine and bricks.

References

Sources

External links
Archaeological museum of Monteleone Sabino 

Sabine cities
Former populated places in Italy
Roman towns and cities in Italy
Archaeological sites in Lazio
Roman sites in Lazio